Buskirk Bridge is a wooden covered bridge and is the name of the hamlet in which it is located.  It is in the town of Hoosick.  The bridge, which crosses the Hoosic River is one of 29 historic covered bridges in New York State. The bridge takes its name from the nearby hamlet of the same name, which was named after the local Van Buskirk family.

Town and Howe truss designs were patented by Ithiel Town in 1820 and William Howe in 1840, respectively.  The Buskirk Bridge a Howe truss design, and was built to replace a previous Burr arch truss.  It is perhaps the earliest Howe truss bridge that survives in New York State.

A topographic map of its location appears in its individual inventory document prepared by the New York State Office of Parks, Recreation and Historic Preservation in 1977.

It is one of four Washington County covered bridges submitted for listing in the National Register of Historic Places in a multiple property submission.  The others are the Rexleigh Bridge, the Eagleville Bridge, and Shushan Bridge.  All four were listed on the National Register of Historic Places on March 8, 1972.

The bridge continues in use for vehicles, and is maintained jointly by Washington County and Rensselaer County.

References

External links

 Buskirk Bridge, at New York State Covered Bridge Society
 Buskirk Bridge, at Covered Bridges of the Northeast USA, a website developed by Hank Brickel

Covered bridges on the National Register of Historic Places in New York (state)
Bridges completed in 1850
National Register of Historic Places in Rensselaer County, New York
Wooden bridges in New York (state)
Bridges in Washington County, New York
Tourist attractions in Washington County, New York
Tourist attractions in Rensselaer County, New York
Bridges in Rensselaer County, New York
Road bridges on the National Register of Historic Places in New York (state)
Howe truss bridges in the United States